Petrus Johannes Marinus "Piet" van der Lans (10 September 1940 – 27 January 2018) was a Dutch track cyclist. He competed at the 1960 Summer Olympics in the 4 km team pursuit and finished in fifth place.

See also
 List of Dutch Olympic cyclists

References

1940 births
2018 deaths
Olympic cyclists of the Netherlands
Cyclists at the 1960 Summer Olympics
Dutch male cyclists
People from Teylingen
Cyclists from South Holland
20th-century Dutch people
21st-century Dutch people